US Airways Arena may refer to:

 US Airways Arena (Washington, D.C.) in Landover, Maryland, previously known as the Capital Centre and as USAir Arena, the now-demolished home of the Washington Capitals, Washington Bullets/Wizards, and Georgetown Hoyas men's basketball team
 US Airways Center, an arena in downtown Phoenix that is currently the home of the NBA's Phoenix Suns